Gigantopelta is a genus of deep sea snails from hydrothermal vents, marine gastropod mollusks in the family Peltospiridae.

Species 
 Gigantopelta aegis Chen, Linse, Roterman, Copley & Rogers, 2015
 Gigantopelta chessoia Chen, Linse, Roterman, Copley & Rogers, 2015

References

External links

Peltospiridae